Botryolepraria is a genus of saxicolous (rock-dwelling), byssoid (cottony) lichens of uncertain familial placement in the order Verrucariales. It has two species. Both species grow in damp conditions, such as on cave walls, particularly in areas with minimal light.

Taxonomy
The genus was circumscribed by Antonio Canals, Mariona Hernández-Mariné, Antonio Gómez-Bolea, and Xavier Llimona in 1997, as a segregate of genus Lepraria, with the widespread and common lichen B. lesdainii as the type, and at that time, only species. The type specimen was collected by French lichenologist Maurice Bouly de Lesdain from a wall in Les Baraques (Calais, France). The genus name combines the Greek-derived botryon ("cluster of berries", referring to the microscopic shrub-like clusters of fungal hyphae and spherical algal cells) with its namesake genus, Lepraria.

Although some later authors did not accept the proposed genus as different from Lepraria, later molecular analysis showed it to be genetically distinct. Although presumed to be a member of the Lecanoromycetes, its precise classification was not clarified. The genus has been subsequently been accepted by most lichenologists, and is considered to be a member of the Verrucariales with uncertain familial placement. A second species, found in the Neotropics, was added to Botryolepraria in 2010. Both species have similar morphology and secondary chemistry.

Description
Botryolepraria species have a pale lime green byssoid (granular cottony) thallus made of free fungal hyphae. The thallus is sterile, meaning is does not produce any sexual reproductive structures, including apothecia. The photobionts, which are green algae from the class Chlorophyceae, form grape-like clusters near the tips of the hyphae. The granules range in size from 100–200 μm in diameter. Botryolepraria lacks typical soredia. Botryolepraria lesdainii produces  lesdainin (6-α-acetoxyhopan-22-ol), a terpenoid compound; zeorin is an accompanying lichen product that also occurs in B. neotropica.

Species
 Botryolepraria lesdainii  – temperate regions of Asia, Europe, Canary Islands; northern North America
 Botryolepraria neotropica  – Bolivia, Cuba, Peru

References

Verrucariales
Eurotiomycetes genera
Lichen genera
Taxa described in 1997